International University Liaison Indonesia (IULI) is a private university established in 2014 as the strategic partner of the European University Consortium-IULI in Indonesia.

IULI Foundation 
The IULI Foundation has been approved by the Ministry of Law and Human Rights of the Republic of Indonesia to operate within the territory of the Republic of Indonesia.

Undergraduate programs 
Engineering
 Automotive Engineering
 Aviation Engineering
 Computer Science
 Industrial Engineering
 Mechatronics Engineering
 Mechanical Engineering
 Food Technology
 Biomedical Engineering
 Chemical Engineering and Biotechnology
Business and Social Sciences
 Hotel and Tourism Management
 International Relations
 International Business Administration
 International Management

IULI is supported by DAAD (German Academic Exchange Service) with funds from German Federal Ministry of Education and Research

Partner Universities 
 Technische Universität München (TUM) Asia, Singapore/Germany
 RWTH Aachen University, Germany
 Technische Universität Ilmenau TU-Ilmenau, Germany
 TU Chemnitz, Germany
 BIGT Bremerhaven, Germany
 Osnabrück University of Applied Sciences, Germany
 MCI Management Center Innsbruck, Austria
 Singapore ETH Centre, Singapore
 University of Zadar, Croatia
 Johannes Kepler University of Linz, Austria
 University of Zagreb, Croatia
 University of Applied Sciences Erfurt, Germany
 University of Applied Sciences Offenburg, Germany
 University of Maribor, Slovenia
 Kazan National Research Technical University (Tupolev University), Russia

External links 
 IULI Official Website
 IULI News
 IULI Admission/Penerimaan Mahasiswa Baru
 IULI Portal

References 

 http://www.dw.de/tu-ilmenau-buka-universitas-di-indonesia/a-17492202
 https://web.archive.org/web/20150402135146/http://forumdialognusantara.org/2015/03/02/sinergi-pemerintah-pengusaha-dan-kaum-intelektual-mendirikan-iuli-2/

Universities in Indonesia
Universities in Jakarta
Engineering universities and colleges in Indonesia
Universities in Banten
Private universities and colleges in Indonesia